Vanessa Jean Simmons (born August 5, 1983) is an American television personality. Her family is featured in the MTV reality show Run's House. She was recently the host and judge of Project Runway: Threads.

Early life
Simmons is the oldest daughter of Joseph Simmons and Valerie Vaughn. She is the older sister to Angela Simmons, Joseph "Jojo" Simmons Jr, Daniel "Diggy" Simmons III, Russell "Russy" Simmons II, Victoria Anne Simmons and Miley Justine Simmons. She is the niece of artist Danny Simmons and Russell Simmons, the co-founder of Def Jam Records.

Career
Simmons found popularity between 2005 and 2009 with her family's MTV reality show Run's House. She and her sister, Angela Simmons, are designers for the shoe brand Pastry. Simmons appeared briefly on the soap opera television show Guiding Light and held a role in the film Speed Dating. In 2008 she secretly entered the Miss California USA pageant. She is in Boogie Town and the ensemble film Dysfunctional Friends. She also starred in the 2014 web series, Mixed. Simmons became the host and judge of Project Runway: Threads in 2014.

Personal life
She attended St John's University.

Simmons and her boyfriend of several years, Michael Wayans have a daughter born in 2014.

She is the daughter of Joseph Simmons.

Filmography

Film

Television

References

External links
 
 Official Run's House Website

1983 births
Living people
Participants in American reality television series
People from Queens, New York
People from Saddle River, New Jersey